Lane Plateau is a flat, ice-covered plateau that rises to  between Mount Waterman, Mount Cartwright, and Mount Bronk in the central Hughes Range of the Queen Maud Mountains, Antarctica.

The plateau was discovered and photographed by R. Admiral Byrd on the Baselaying Flight of November 18, 1929, and surveyed by A.P. Crary, 1957–58. It was mapped by the United States Geological Survey from surveys, 1962–63, and U.S. Navy photography taken 1958–63. The plateau is named in honor of Neal Lane, Director of the National Science Foundation (NSF) from 1993 to 1998. Under his leadership the NSF won congressional approval for rebuilding South Pole Station as a premier international science facility set to open at the beginning of the 21st century.

References

Plateaus of Antarctica
Landforms of the Ross Dependency
Dufek Coast